The 1970 Tampa Spartans football team represented the University of Tampa in the 1970 NCAA College Division football season. It was the Spartans' 34th season and competed as a College Division Independent. The team was led by head coach Fran Curci, in his third year, and played their home games at Tampa Stadium in Tampa, Florida. They finished with a record of ten wins and one loss (10–1).

Three Tampa players were recognized on the 1970 Little All-America college football team. Running back Leon McQuay received first-team honors, tackle John Morring received second-team honors, and defensive tackle Sammy Gellerstedt received third-team honors.

The Spartans opened the season with a 45–12 victory , and in the win Leon McQuay ran for 177 yards for Tampa in the win. In their second game, Tampa shutout  20–0 in what was the Cowboys' first loss since 1966. Against the Hurricanes, Tampa had one of the bigger upsets of the season with their 31–14 win. Former Miami quarterback Lew Pytel started for the Spartans, and the upset was considered unlikely to happen as Miami played in the University Division and the Spartans played in the lower College Division.

After their upset at Miami, Tampa was ranked as the No. 1 team in the College Division, returned home and defeated  33–10 to remain undefeated. The Spartans then won a pair of games in Louisiana against Louisiana Tech and  before they returned home for the final three games of the season. Against Vanderbilt, Tampa was required to suspend five players, that included three starters on the defense, to comply with Southeastern Conference rules for transfer players as the Spartans played as an Independent. Without several of their defensive starters, Tampa lost their lone game of the season against the Commodores 28–36 before 35,893 fans. After the end of the season, on December 19, Curci was hired by Miami to serve as their new head coach.

Schedule

References

Tampa
Tampa Spartans football seasons
Tampa Spartans football